Annie Suzanne Girardot (25 October 193128 February 2011) was a French actress. She often played strong-willed, independent, hard-working, and often lonely women, imbuing her characters with an earthiness and reality that endeared her to women undergoing similar daily struggles.

Over the course of a five-decade career, she starred in nearly 150 films. She was a three-time César Award winner (1977, 1996, 2002), a two-time Molière Award winner (2002), a David di Donatello Award winner (1977), a BAFTA nominee (1962), and a recipient of several international prizes including the Volpi Cup (Best actress) at the 1965 Venice Film Festival for Three Rooms in Manhattan.

Breakthrough and early career 
After graduating from the prestigious Conservatoire de la rue Blanche in 1954 with two First Prizes in Modern and Classical Comedy, Girardot joined the Comédie Française, where she was a resident actor from 1954 to 1957.

She made her film debut in Thirteen at the Table (Treize à table, 1955), but it was with theatre that she was beginning to attract the attention of critics. Her performance in a revival of Jean Cocteau's play La Machine à écrire in 1956 was admired by the author who called her "The finest dramatic temperament of the Postwar period". In 1958, Luchino Visconti directed her opposite Jean Marais in a French stage adaptation of William Gibson's Two for the Seesaw.

In 1956, she was awarded the Prix Suzanne Bianchetti as best up-and-coming young actress, but only with Luchino Visconti's epic Rocco e i suoi fratelli (Rocco and His Brothers, 1960), she was able to draw the public's attention. In 1962, she married Italian actor Renato Salvatori. Travelling back and forth between two film careers in France and Italy, Girardot worked with Italian directors, including Marco Ferreri in the scandalous The Ape Woman (1964), which became one of the main attractions at the 1964 Cannes Film Festival. In 1968, she also starred in the cult anti-consumerism French film Erotissimo (Gérard Pirès, 1968).

Ignored by French New Wave directors (with the exception of Claude Lelouch), Girardot found her glory in popular cinema alongside more established and traditional directors such as Jean Delannoy, Marcel Carné, Michel Boisrond, André Cayatte, Gilles Grangier, or André Hunebelle.

The 1970s: France's biggest female movie star 

By the end of the 1960s, she had become a movie star and a box-office magnet in France with such films as Vice and Virtue (1963); Live for Life (1967); Love Is a Funny Thing (1969); and Mourir d'aimer (To die of love, 1971), the fact-based tale of Gabrielle Russier (1937–1969), a thirty year old teacher whose affair with a much younger student made her the object of bourgeoisie ridicule. The film was nominated for a Golden Globe, and remains Girardot's biggest box office hit in France.

Throughout the 1970s, Girardot came back and forth between drama and comedy, proving herself an adept comedian in such successful comedies as Claude Zidi's La Zizanie, Michel Audiard's She Does Not Drink, Smoke or Flirt But... She Talks (Elle boit pas, elle fume pas, elle drague pas, mais... elle cause !, 1970) or Philippe de Broca's Dear Inspector (Tendre poulet, 1977). She starred in the teen movie, The Slap (La Gifle, 1974) as Isabelle Adjani's mother. In 1972, she said in an interview to The New York Times, citing as Exhibit A her role as a sideshow freak in The Ape Woman, "I think I've proven that I'm opposed to typecasting. I believe that the acting of any role — from duchess to kitchen slavey — must be a form of transformation". She won her first César Award for Best Actress portraying the title character in the drama Docteur Françoise Gailland (1976). Throughout the 1970s, she was the highest-paid actress in France, and was nicknamed "La Girardot" by the press as her name alone was seen as enough to guarantee the success of a film. Between the release of Live for Life (1967) and Jupiter's Thigh (1980), 24 of her films have attracted more than one million admissions in France.

Girardot's became one of the symbols of the 1970s feminist movement in France, as the audience embraced the "everywoman" quality she brought to the strong-minded female characters she regularly played in both dramas and comedies. In her 1989 autobiography, Vivre d'aimer, she wrote: "People didn't come to watch a beautiful, vamp-like creature, but simply a woman. [...] I played a judge, a lawyer, a taxi driver, a cop, a surgeon. I was never a glamorous star."

From the 1980s onwards: Fading stardom and comeback 

The 1980s were less kind, as her career floundered and parts dwindled. In 1983, she lost a fortune when Revue Et Corrigée, the musical show she put on and starred in at the Casino de Paris, flopped. She suffered from depression, but bounced back with several television series in France and Italy. However, Girardot had a major comeback on the big screen playing a peasant wife in Claude Lelouch's Les Misérables (1995). The role won her a second César Award for Best Supporting Actress in 1996. Upon accepting the award, a joyous and tearful Girardot expressed her happiness that she had not been forgotten by the film industry in a speech that remained very famous. In 1992, she was the Head of the Jury at the 42nd Berlin International Film Festival.

She was awarded the César Award for Best Supporting Actress for her role in The Piano Teacher (2001). She collaborated with director Michael Haneke again, in Caché (2005).

On stage she had a triumph in 1974 with Madame Marguerite, which became her signature role that she reprised on numerous occasions until 2002. That year she was awarded the Molière Award for this role, along with an Honorary Molière Award for her entire stage career.

Girardot is the highest ranked woman in the list of French stars who have appeared in the most movies that have attracted more than one million admissions in France since 1945, with 44 films.

Personal life, illness and death 
She married Italian actor Renato Salvatori in 1962. They had a daughter, Giulia, and later separated but never divorced. Salvatori died in 1988.

After going public in the 21 September 2006 issue of Paris Match with the news that she was suffering from Alzheimer's disease, she became a symbol of the illness in France. On 28 February 2011, Girardot died in a hospital in Paris, aged 79. She was interred at Père-Lachaise Cemetery, in Paris.

Legacy 
 17 French municipalities have named streets after her, including the 13th arrondissement of Paris, Toulouse, Angers, etc.
 In October 2012, France's Postal service has issued a collection of stamps dedicated to six major figures of French Post-War cinema, including Annie Girardot.
 In 2013, the 37th annual César Awards 2012 selected a picture of Annie Girardot from the 1962 film Rocco and His Brothers as the official promotional poster of the ceremony, during which she was paid tribute with a retrospective montage of her most memorable roles on film.
 Sancar Seckiner's book South (Güney), published July 2013, consists of 12 article and essays. One of them, "Girardot's Eyes", highlights broader comment of Annie Girardot' s performance in the cinema of art. .

Filmography

References

External links 

 
 
 New York Times obituary

1931 births
2011 deaths
20th-century French actresses
21st-century French actresses
Actresses from Paris
French National Academy of Dramatic Arts alumni
Burials at Père Lachaise Cemetery
Deaths from Alzheimer's disease
Deaths from dementia in France
French film actresses
French stage actresses
French television actresses
Best Actress César Award winners
Best Supporting Actress César Award winners
David di Donatello winners
Volpi Cup for Best Actress winners
Troupe of the Comédie-Française